Gumtala is an urban area of Amritsar India in the state of Punjab. It is very close to the Sri Guru Ram Dass Jee International Airport.It serves as a major interchange of two national highways i.e. National Highway 354 (India) and National Highway 3 (India).

About 
Village Gumtala is very close to the guru ram das ji internattinal airport  in  amritsar punjab. Gumtala is known in the region as the village with large homes or "khotis". The village residents mainly have the surname Pahal and are known as wealthy land owners.{{citation needed|date=July 2016}

References

Villages in Jalandhar district